Jharsuguda Road railway station is a railway station on the East Coast Railway zone in the state of Odisha, India. Its code is JSGR. It serves Jharsuguda. It has two platforms. It is a by-pass station, connecting Sambalpur & Bilaspur by skipping Jharsuguda Junction. Passenger, Express and Superfast trains halt at Jharsuguda Road railway station.

Major Trains
 Hirakud Express
 Indore–Puri Humsafar Express
 Valsad–Puri Superfast Express
 Bikaner–Puri Express
 Puri–Jodhpur Express
 Lokmanya Tilak Terminus–Puri Superfast Express
 Lokmanya Tilak Terminus–Bhubaneswar Superfast Express
 Rourkela - Puri Passenger
 Bilaspur - Titlagarh Passenger
 Jharsuguda - Sambalpur MEMU

See also
 Jharsuguda District

References

Railway stations in Jharsuguda district
Chakradharpur railway division